is a Japanese original anime television series by studio Seven Arcs Pictures. The series premiered from January 12 to March 30, 2019.

Characters

Production and release
The series was announced during a Cardfight!! Vanguard event. The series is produced by Bushiroad and animated by Seven Arcs Pictures, with Junji Nishimura serving as the director and Michiko Yokote writing the script. Takayoshi Hashimoto is designing the series characters based on the original designs by Takuya Fujima. The series aired from January 12 to March 30, 2019 on Tokyo MX. Sentai Filmworks have licensed the series.

Theme songs
Opening theme
 "Wonderland Girl" by Pastel*Palettes
Ending theme
  by Bermuda Triangle

Notes

References

External links
  
 

2019 anime television series debuts
Anime spin-offs
Anime with original screenplays
Cardfight!! Vanguard
Bushiroad
Mermaids in television
Sentai Filmworks
Seven Arcs